Lee Berger  (born 16 January 1970), is an Australian biologist and veterinarian, who discovered during her PhD that the fungus Batrachochytrium dendrobatidis was responsible for the decline and extinction of hundreds of amphibian species.

Early life and career 
Berger was born in Epsom, England in 1970, but moved to Melbourne, Australia with her family just a year later. She earned her undergraduate degree in Veterinary Science from the University of Melbourne. She was awarded her PhD at James Cook University in 2001 under the supervision of Rick Speare. In her PhD she aimed to find the cause of the decline of amphibians in Queensland between the 1970s and 1990s. She identified the cause as being a chytrid fungus, Batrachochytrium dendrobatidis, which causes a disease called chytridiomycosis. She served as the Associate Dean of Research within the College of Public Health, Medical and Veterinary Sciences at James Cook University. She is currently an adjunct professor at James Cook University and the University of Melbourne.

Discovery of chytridiomycosis 
In 1990 a mysterious decline in frog species was observed in Australia. Professor Lee Berger discovered Chytridiomycosis Dendrobatidae in 1993.  Rick Speare theorised that this was caused by an infectious disease and hired Berger to study this. At the time it was thought that infectious diseases could not cause an extinction. However, in 1998 Berger was able to identify a fungus, called Batrachochytrium dendrobatidis, in the skin of the frog. This fungus disrupts the skin, making the frogs unable to absorb electrolytes and water, ultimately causing them to die. Her work on this infectious disease has helped to change practices in conservation around the world.

Awards 

 2000 – CSIRO Medal for Research Achievement
 2007 – Ian Clunies Ross Memorial Award
 2011 – Australian Research Council Future Fellow
 2018 – Frank Fenner Prize for Life Scientist of the Year
2020 – Fellow, Australian Academy of Science

References 

1970 births
Living people
Australian biologists
Australian herpetologists
Australian veterinarians
Academic staff of James Cook University
Academic staff of the University of Melbourne
Fellows of the Australian Academy of Science